Zeta-carotene desaturase may refer to:

 9,9'-Dicis-zeta-carotene desaturase, an enzyme
 Carotene 7,8-desaturase, an enzyme